The transverse occipital sulcus is a structure in the occipital lobe.

The transverse occipital sulcus is continuous with the posterior end of the occipital ramus of the intraparietal sulcus, and runs across the upper part of the lobe, a short distance behind the parietooccipital fissure.

References 

Sulci (neuroanatomy)
Occipital lobe